8192 is the natural number following 8191 and preceding 8193.

8192 is a power of two:  (2 to the 13th power).

Because it is two times a sixth power (8192 = 2 × 46), it is also a Bhaskara twin. That is, 8192 has the property that twice its square is a cube and twice its cube is a square.

In computing 
 8192 (213) is the maximum number of fragments for IPv4 datagram.

References

Integers